Latino Orsini (1411 – 11 August 1477) was an Italian Cardinal.

Of the Roman branch of the Orsini family and the owner of rich possessions, he entered the ranks of the Roman clergy as a youth, became subdeacon, and as early as 10 March 1438, was raised to the Episcopal See of Conza in Southern Italy. Transferred from this see to that of Trani (Southern Italy) in 1439, he remained archbishop of Trani after his elevation to the cardinalate by Pope Nicholas V on 20 December 1448.

In 1450, the Archbishopric of Urbino was conferred upon him, which made it possible for him to take up his residence in Rome, the See of Trani being given to his brother, Giovanni Orsini, Abbot of Farfa. Pope Paul II appointed him papal legate for the Marches.

Pope Sixtus IV, for whose election in 1471 Cardinal Latino had worked energetically, named him Camerlengo of the Holy Roman Church, granted him in 1472 the Archdiocese of Taranto, which he governed by proxy, and, in addition, placed him at the head of the government of the Papal States. He was also appointed commander-in-chief of the papal fleet in the war against the Turks, and, acting for the pope, crowned Ferdinand I of Naples.

He founded in Rome the monastery of S. Salvatore in Lauro, which he richly endowed and in which he established the canons regular, donating to it also numerous manuscripts. In the last years of his life he became deeply religious, though he had been worldly in his youth, leaving a natural son named Paul, whom, with the consent of the pope, he made heir of his vast possessions.

Honours
Orsini Rock in Antarctica is named after Latino Orsini.

References

Acknowledgment

External links
Kirsch, Johann Peter. "Orsini." The Catholic Encyclopedia. Vol. 11. New York: Robert Appleton Company, 1911, p. 327. Retrieved: 2017-03-25.
Bust of Cardinal Orsini

1411 births
1477 deaths
Latino
15th-century Italian cardinals
Cardinal-bishops of Albano
Cardinal-nephews
15th-century Italian Roman Catholic archbishops
Bishops in Apulia
Camerlengos of the Holy Roman Church
Archbishops of Trani
Archbishops of Sant'Angelo dei Lombardi-Conza-Nusco-Bisaccia